Higgins Corner is an unincorporated community in Nevada County, California. It lies at an elevation of 1427 feet (435 m).

History
Higgins Corner was named after a Gold Rush settler, Michael J. Higgins. The name, Higgins Corner was first recorded in the 1860s. Michael J. Higgins homesteaded 160 acres of land at Wolf Road. A long time resident (since 1955), Willard Shoellerman, states that the area has been called Higgins Corner for a century.

A Bill Higgins arrived in the area in the late 1800s; while he coincidentally shared the name Higgins, he was not related to Michael J. Higgins.

During the Gold Rush times, the Higgins Corner Bar was the meeting place that a gold-running gang used as their headquarters. This resulted in the kidnapping and eventual killing of several children.

In 1952 a temporary San Quentin prisoner forestry camp was located at Higgins Corner.

Description
A 2014 article on Higgins Corner states that the area includes the Lake of the Pines housing development, several small-scale shopping centers, the Forest Lake Christian School, the Higgins Lions community club, six churches, several ranches and "cottage home businesses". It also has a fire department that provides service for the area along with the Higgins County Department of Forestry.

The Lake of the Pines housing complex was formerly a cattle ranch. As of the 1980s it contained 3,000 lots, that sustained housing for 4,500 residents.

Climate
According to the Köppen Climate Classification system, Higgins Corner has a warm-summer Mediterranean climate, abbreviated "Csa" on climate maps.

References

External links
 Higgins Corner, California Area Development Plan

Unincorporated communities in California
Unincorporated communities in Nevada County, California